Kajsa Magdalena Bergström (born 3 January 1981) is a Swedish curler. The younger sister of curler Anna Le Moine, she has skipped for the club Sveg CK for the past two years.

Bergström played on the Swedish team in the 2009 Mount Titlis World Women's Curling Championship and was selected as the alternate for the Swedish women's curling team at the 2010 Vancouver Olympic Games.

Teammates 
2009 Gangneung World Championships

2010 Vancouver Olympic Games

Anette Norberg, Skip

Eva Lund, Third

Cathrine Lindahl, Second

Anna Le Moine, Lead

References

External links
 

1981 births
Living people
People from Härjedalen
Swedish female curlers
Curlers at the 2010 Winter Olympics
Olympic gold medalists for Sweden
Olympic curlers of Sweden
Olympic medalists in curling
Medalists at the 2010 Winter Olympics